Patrick "Diba" Nwegbo (born January 1, 2002) is a Nigerian-American footballer who plays as a forward for the USL Championship club Birmingham Legion.

Career

Youth & College
Nwegbo was born in the Acworth, Georgia to Nigerian parents. He attended North Cobb High School, where he was named to the Region 3-AAAAA Team of the Year in 2018 after scoring 21 goals and tallying six assists, making him the top goal scorer in the region. He also played club soccer with Smyrna Soccer Club between 2017 and 2018, then Alabama FC in 2018 to 2019. Nwegbo was invited to 2018 ECNL National Training Camp as well as with receiving a call up to the Nigeria national under-17 football team.

In 2019, Nwegbo attended the College of William & Mary to play college soccer. In four seasons with the Tribe, Nwegbo made 57 appearances, scoring nine goals and adding 17 assists. In 2021, he was named Second Team All-CAA and Second Team VaSID All-State.

While at college, Nwegbo competed in the USL League Two. He spent 2021 with Southern Soccer Academy Kings, and 2022 with Vermont Green, where he scored nine goals in 12 appearances.

Following college, Nwegbo entered the 2023 MLS SuperDraft, but went undrafted.

Birmingham Legion
On March 9, 2023, Nwegbo signed with USL Championship side Birmingham Legion. He made his professional debut on March 11, 2023, starting in a 1–1 draw with Pittsburgh Riverhounds.

References

External links
 

2002 births
Living people
American soccer players
American sportspeople of Nigerian descent
Association football forwards
Birmingham Legion FC players
Expatriate soccer players in the United States
Nigerian expatriate footballers
Nigerian expatriate sportspeople in the United States
Nigerian footballers
Soccer players from Georgia (U.S. state)
USL Championship players
USL League Two players
William & Mary Tribe men's soccer players